Lexicographic optimization is a kind of Multi-objective optimization. In general, multi-objective optimization deals with optimization problems with two or more objective functions to be optimized simultaneously. Often, the different objectives can be ranked in order of importance to the decision-maker, so that objective  is the most important, objective  is the next most important, and so on. In other words, the decision-maker has lexicographic preferences, ranking the possible solutions according to a lexicographic order of their objective function values. Lexicographic optimization is sometimes called preemptive optimization, since a small increase in one objective value preempts a much larger increase in less important objective values.

As an example, consider a firm who puts safety above all. So it wants to maximize the safety of its workers and customers. Subject to attaining the maximum possible safety, it wants to maximize profits. This firm performs lexicographic optimization, where  denots safety and  denotes profits.

As another example, in project management, when analyzing PERT networks, one often wants to minimize the mean completion time, and subject to this, minimize the variance of the completion time.

Notation 
A lexicographic minimization problem can be defined analogously.

Algorithms 
There are several algorithms for solving lexicographic optimization problems.

Sequential algorithm for general objectives 
A leximin optimization problem witn n objectives can be solved using a sequence of n single-objective optimization problems, as follows:

 For t = 1,...,n do
Solve the following single-objective problem:
If the problem is infeasible or unbounded, stop and declare that there is no solution.
End for

The sequential algorithm is general - it can be applied whenever we have a solver for the single-objective functions.

Lexicographic simplex algorithm for linear objectives 
Linear lexicographic optimization is a special case of lexicographic optimization in which the objectives are linear, and the feasible set is described by linear inequalities. It can be written as:where  are vectors representing the linear objectives to maximize, ordered from the most to the least important;   is the vector of decision variables; and the feasible set is determined by the matrix  and the vector . 

Isermann extended the theory of linear programming duality to lexicographic linear programs, and developed a lexicographic simplex algorithm. In contrast to the sequential algorithm, this simplex algorithm considers all objective functions simultaneously.

Weighted average for linear objectives 
Sherali and Soyster prove that, for any linear lexicographic optimization problem, there exist a set of weights  such that the set of lexicographically-optimal solutions is identical to the set of solutions to the following single-objective problem:If we could compute these weights, we could reduce the lexicographic optimization problem to a single-objective optimization problem. However, finding these weights might be more difficult than solving the problem using the sequential algorithm; hence, the authors claim that their method is mainly of theoretic interest.

Cococcioni, Pappalardo and Sergeyev show that, given a computer that can make numeric computations with infinitesimals, it is possible to choose weights that are infinitesimals (is infinitesimal;  is infinitesimal-squared; etc.), and thus reduce linear lexicographic optimization to single-objective linear programming with infinitesimals. They present an adaptation of the simplex algorithm to infinitesimals, and present some running examples.

Properties 
(1) Uniqueness. In general, a lexicographic optimization problem may have more than one optimal solution. Moreover, if the feasible domain is a convex set, and the objective functions are strictly concave, then the problem has at most one optimal solution, since if there were two different optimal solutions, their mean would be another feasible solution in which the objective functions attain a higher value - contradicting the optimality of the original solutions.

(2) Partial sums. Given a vector  of functions to optimize, for all t in 1,...,n, define  = the sum of all functions from the most important to the t-th most important one. Then, the original lexicographic optimization problem is equivalent to the following:In some cases, the second problem may be easier to solve.

See also 

 Lexicographic max-min optimization is a variant of lexicographic optimization in which all objectives are equally important, and the goal is to maximize the smallest objective, then the second-smallest objective, and so on.
 In game theory, the nucleolus is defined as a lexicographically-minimal solution set.

References 

Multiple-criteria decision analysis
Optimization algorithms and methods